Orthonevra is a genus of fly in the syrphidae family with at least 59 species identified so far. They are worldwide in distribution but concentrated in the Eastern North America and Europe.Orthonevra are commonly called  Mucksuckers after the larvae which have been found in organic rich mud, i.e. muck. This genus belongs to the tribe  Brachyopini that includes the prominent genera Melanogaster, Brachyopa, Neoascia and Sphegina. 
Orthonevra have black heads with blue to purple reflections. Many species have distinctive eye stripes.  The antennae are somewhat elongate. (see image) The frons is wrinkled with silvery spots at sides of antennae. The thorax with small punctures dorsally and in several species the body is covered with scale-like pile. Wingd vein M1 curves away from the wing tip.(see images)

Guides

Seman reviewed north american species as of 1964

The most comprehensive of existing keys to European Orthonevra species is that of van Veen (2004), 
M.C.D.Speight has also documented European species.

Species

Orthonevra aenethorax Kohli, Kapoor & Gupta, 1988
Orthonevra anniae (Sedman, 1966)
Orthonevra argentina (Brèthes, 1922)
Orthonevra auritarsis Brădescu, 1992
Orthonevra bellula (Williston, 1882)
Orthonevra brevicornis (Loew, 1843)
Orthonevra ceratura (Stackelberg, 1952)
Orthonevra chilensis (Thompson, 1999)
Orthonevra elegans (Meigen, 1822)
Orthonevra erythrogona (Malm, 1863)
Orthonevra feei (Moran and Skevington, 2019)
Orthonevra flukei (Sedman, 1964)
Orthonevra frontalis (Loew, 1843)
Orthonevra gemmula (Violovitsh, 1979)
Orthonevra geniculata (Meigen, 1830)
Orthonevra gewgaw (Hull, 1941)
Orthonevra incisa (Loew, 1843)
Orthonevra intermedia (Lundbeck, 1916)
Orthonevra inundata (Violovitsh, 1979)
Orthonevra karumaiensis (Matsumura, 1916)
Orthonevra kozlovi (Stackelberg, 1952)
Orthonevra labyrinthops (Hull, 1944j)
Orthonevra minuta (Hull, 1945)
Orthonevra montana Vujić, 1999
Orthonevra neotropica (Shannon, 1925a)
Orthonevra nigrovittata (Loew, 1876)
Orthonevra nitida (Wiedemann, 1830)
Orthonevra nitidula (Curran, 1925)
Orthonevra nobilis (Fallén, 1817)
Orthonevra onytes (Séguy, 1961)
Orthonevra parva (Shannon, 1916)
Orthonevra pictipennis (Loew, 1863)
Orthonevra plumbago (Loew, 1840)
Orthonevra pulchella (Williston, 1887)
Orthonevra quadristriata (Shannon & Aubertin, 1933)
Orthonevra robusta (Shannon, 1916)
Orthonevra sachalinensis (Violovitsh, 1956)
Orthonevra shannoni (Curran, 1925a)
Orthonevra shusteri Brădescu, 1993
Orthonevra sinuosa (Bigot, 1884)
Orthonevra sonorensis (Shannon, 1964)
Orthonevra stackelbergi Thompson & Torp, 1982
Orthonevra stigmata (Williston, 1882)
Orthonevra subincisa (Violovitsh, 1979)
Orthonevra tristis (Loew, 1871)
Orthonevra unicolor (Shannon, 1916)
Orthonevra vagabunda (Violovitsh, 1979)
Orthonevra varga (Violovitsh, 1979)
Orthonevra weemsi (Sedman, 1966)

References

Eristalinae
Hoverfly genera
Taxa named by Pierre-Justin-Marie Macquart